Nenad Lazarevski (born 3 July 1986) is a Serbian-born Macedonian football defender.

Club career
Born in Novi Sad, SR Serbia, SFR Yugoslavia, Lazarevski started playing for FK Novi Sad. In 2006, he moved to Russia where he played with the B team of FC Lokomotiv Moscow and after half of year he moved to Bulgaria where he played with PFC Slavia Sofia in the PFG A. In 2007, he returned to Serbia and joined SuperLiga side FK Borac Čačak.

In the summer of 2009 he signed with another SuperLiga side, OFK Beograd, but after a year was loaned to FK Radnički Sombor in the Serbian First League. Two years later he was released by OFK and he joined the club he had represented at the beginning of his career, RFK Novi Sad.

International career
In 2004, he started playing for the Serbia and Montenegro under-19 team.

In 2007, he started representing the Macedonia under-21 team.

References

1986 births
Living people
Footballers from Novi Sad
Association football defenders
Serbian footballers
Serbia youth international footballers
Macedonian footballers
North Macedonia under-21 international footballers
RFK Novi Sad 1921 players
FC Lokomotiv Moscow players
PFC Slavia Sofia players
FK Borac Čačak players
OFK Beograd players
FK Radnički Sombor players
FK Inđija players
FK Modriča players
Serbian SuperLiga players
Serbian First League players
First Professional Football League (Bulgaria) players
First League of the Federation of Bosnia and Herzegovina players
Serbian expatriate footballers
Macedonian expatriate footballers
Expatriate footballers in Bulgaria
Macedonian expatriate sportspeople in Bulgaria
Expatriate footballers in Russia
Macedonian expatriate sportspeople in Russia
Expatriate footballers in Bosnia and Herzegovina
Macedonian expatriate sportspeople in Bosnia and Herzegovina